Lorenzo Respighi (7 October 1824 – 10 December 1889) was an Italian mathematician and natural philosopher.  Born at Cortemaggiore, Piacenza, to Luigi Respighi and Giuseppina Rossetti. He studied mathematics and natural philosophy, first at Parma and then at the University of Bologna, where he obtained his degree ad honorem in 1845. 
From 1855 to 1864 he was director of the Astronomic Observatory of Bologna, and during these years he discovered three comets, #1862 IV, #1863 III and #1863 V.
In 1865 he was nominated director of the Astronomic Observatory of the Campidoglio, in Rome.

The crater Respighi on the Moon is named after him.

Sources

19th-century Italian mathematicians
1824 births
1889 deaths
University of Bologna alumni